Sandwith is a surname. Notable people with the surname include:

 Arnold Sandwith Ward (1876–1950), British journalist and Conservative politician
 Charles Sandwith Campbell (1858–1923), Canadian benefactor, Montreal's Campbell Concerts and Campbell Parks
 Bill Sandwith (1922–99), Australian politician
 Kevin Sandwith (born 1978), English football player
 Noel Yvri Sandwith (1901–65), botanist at the Royal Botanic Gardens, Kew
 Noelle Sandwith (1927–2006), English artist
 Terran Sandwith (born 1972), Canadian ice hockey player